Alex Hutchinson is an Australian video game director and designer. He is best known for his work as the creative director for Ubisoft's Assassin's Creed III and Far Cry 4. After a long stint at Ubisoft he has since co-founded his own video game development company, Typhoon Studios.

Career 

Hutchinson began his career in the games industry as a designer at Torus Games in Australia, but quickly left for an opportunity at Electronic Arts subsidiary, Maxis where he worked as a Lead Designer on the popular gaming series, The Sims as well as leading the design on Spore. In 2008 he moved to Canada to take a role as Creative Director at EA Montreal on Army of Two: The 40th Day before taking the same role at Ubisoft Montreal where he directed Assassin's Creed III and Far Cry 4. Assassin's Creed III was showcased at E3 2012 and Far Cry 4 at E3 2014, where it was presented by Hutchinson himself.

In 2017, he founded the video game studio Typhoon Studios in Montreal with his partners Yassine Riahi and Reid Schneider. The studio's first game Journey to the Savage Planet was announced at the 2018 Game Awards. Google, under their Stadia brand, acquired Typhoon in December 2019. Typhoon Studios was shut down alongside SG&E in February 2021. The Journey development team was reunited after Hutchinson, Schneider, Yannick Simard, Erick Bilodeau, and Marc-Antoine Lussier founded Raccoon Logic in 2021.

Works

Controversies 

On October 22, 2020, Alex Hutchinson tweeted the following:

Which generated public backlash. Following, Google stated that what Hutchinson said does not represent the company's vision.

References 

Australian expatriates in Canada
Australian video game designers
Australian video game directors
Living people
Ubisoft people
Year of birth missing (living people)